Patriarch Dorotheus may refer to:

 Dorotheus of Bulgaria, Patriarch of Bulgaria in 1300–c. 1315
 Four Greek Orthodox Patriarchs of Antioch, see the list of Greek Orthodox Patriarchs of Antioch
 Dorotheus V Ibn Al-Ahmar, Melkite Patriarch of Antioch from 1604 to 1611